Tongzhi (lit. 'same will' or 'same purpose') is a form of style used in China. It has taken on various meanings in various contexts since the 20th century.

The term was introduced into Vernacular Chinese by Sun Yat-sen as a way of describing his followers. Following the establishment of the People's Republic of China, "tongzhi" was used to mean "comrade" in the Communist sense: it was used to address almost everyone, male and female, young and old. In recent years, however, this meaning of the term has fallen out of common usage, except within Chinese Communist Party discourse and among people of older generations.

In contemporary Macau and Hong Kong, the term mainly refers to LGBT people instead of the traditional political usage.

Usage in party politics
It remains in use in a formal context among political parties in both Mainland China and Taiwan. In the Communist Party of China, categorizing a person as a "comrade" is especially significant for a person who has been denounced or demoted, because it indicates that the party has not completely rejected the person as "one of its own". In Taiwan, it also remains in formal usage in party politics. For example, Frank Hsieh said, after losing the 2008 Republic of China presidential election: "" ("Many comrades hoped that I could stay to May 25").

In October 2016, the Central Committee of the Communist Party of China issued a directive urging all 90 million party members to keep calling each other "comrades" instead of less egalitarian terms.

Military usage
The word comrade is in the regulations of the Chinese Armed Forces as one of three appropriate ways to formally address another member of the military ("comrade" plus rank or position, as in "Comrade Colonel", or simply "comrade(s)" when lacking information about the person's rank, or talking to several service people.)

Usage in contemporary Macau and Hong Kong
Since the 1990s, the term is, however, increasingly being used to refer to sexual minorities mainly in Macau and Hong Kong and increasingly in Mainland China and Taiwan, including lesbian, gay, bisexual and transgender people. This way of using the term was first adopted by Michael Lam, a columnist writing in Hong Kong magazine City Magazine, and was popularized by the inaugural Hong Kong Lesbian and Gay Film Festival in 1989, whose aim was to present same-sex relationships as positive and suggesting solidarity between LGBT people, while also providing an indigenous term to describe same-sex love.

It is preferred by LGBT communities over the term tóngxìnglìan, the formal word for homosexuality, which is seen as being too clinical and having pathological connotations. The use of tongzhi over tóngxìnglìan roughly parallels the replacement of "homosexual" with "gay" in English discourse.

Although it initially referred to gay (male tongzhi) and lesbian (female tongzhi) people, in recent years, the term gradually covers a wider range of meaning including "LGBTQIA". For example, Taiwan LGBT Pride parade, Asia's biggest LGBT pride parade, can be literally translated as "Taiwan Tongzhi Parade." According to Chou Wah-Shan, tóngzhì is a very fluid term which can refer to all people who are opposed to or fall outside of heteronormativity. He views tóngzhì as a means of signifying "politics beyond the homo-hetero duality" and "integrating the sexual into the social".

See also
 Homosexuality in China
 Taiwan Tongzhi Hotline Association
 Tongqi
 Generation gap
 LGBT topics and Confucianism
 Tovarishch (disambiguation)

References

Further reading
 Chou Wah-shan, Tongzhi: Politics of Same-Sex Eroticism in Chinese Societies, Haworth Press, 2000, 
 Yuzhi Chen. 2012. Tongzhi in China: A social marker or not? Working Papers in Educational Linguistics (University of Pennsylvania) 27.2: 97–109. Web access to this article

External links
 Canadian Tongzhi Association  
  ("Rules for speaking for attending comrades at the 2nd plenary meeting of the 17th central committee of the Chinese Kuomintang"): example of usage in Kuomintang discourse

1980s neologisms
LGBT terminology
LGBT in China
Chinese culture
Taiwanese culture